This is a list of Brazilian television related events from 1987.

Events

Debuts

Television shows

1970s
Turma da Mônica (1976–present)

1980s
Xou da Xuxa (1986-1992)

Ending this year

Births
19 June - Sthefany Brito, actress
24 July - Rainer Cadete, actor
11 August - Jonatas Faro, actor & singer
21 October - Tiago Abravanel, actor & singer
1 November - Marcello Melo Jr., actor, singer-songwriter & model

Deaths

See also
1987 in Brazil